The discography of American rapper Lil Skies consists of two studio albums, four mixtapes, one extended play, and 55 singles (including 27 as a featured artist).

Albums

Studio albums

Mixtapes

Extended plays

Singles

As lead artist

As featured artist

Notes

Guest appearances

Other charted and certified songs

References 

Discographies of American artists
Hip hop discographies